The  is a streetcar line of Hiroshima Electric Railway (Hiroden) in Hiroshima, Japan. The line has been operated since 1917.

The total distance of the line is 1.4 kilometers. Routes 7 and 8 operate on the line. The line has five stations, numbered Y1 through Y5.

Stations

See also

Yokogawa Line
Railway lines opened in 1917